The Alvis Tactica is a 4x4 or 6x6 wheeled military vehicle produced by GKN Defense, Alvis plc and later by BAE Systems Land Systems. The vehicle was designed by Glover Webb and introduced in 1988. It comes in a number of variants including APC and Internal Security and Riot Control. The platform is no longer produced by BAE Systems.

Users
Never an armed military vehicle, the Tactica is also suited for civilian use, namely by police forces. Ideally suited as an armoured personnel carrier the first Tacticas were based on Stonefield chassis and latterly by Mol chassis designed in-house at Glover Webb Limited of Hamble, Hampshire, UK. Variants included ambulances, APCs, water cannons, crowd control, perimeter control, and IEDD.

Variants are in service with the following nations:

  Argentine Army: 10 deployed at United Nations Peacekeeping Force in Cyprus
  Ghana Army
  Indonesia (12 deployed by police force)
  Mauritius (14 deployed by military)
  Norway - (Norwegian Army, 3 in service as ambulances)
  Saudi Arabia - (Saudi Arabian National Guard and Ministry of Interior)
  - British Army beginning in 1993 in Northern Ireland; now all retired
  1+

See also
 Pinzgauer High-Mobility All-Terrain Vehicle
 RG-12
 M1117 Armored Security Vehicle
 TPz Fuchs
 Véhicule de l'avant blindé
 BOV M11
 BRDM-2
 WZ551
 Anoa
 Ratel IFV
 Fahd

References

External links

 BAE Tactica

Military vehicles of the United Kingdom
Off-road vehicles
Tactica